Ulotrichopus stertzi is a moth of the  family Erebidae. It is found in the Democratic Republic of Congo (Orientale), Nigeria, Oman, Rwanda, South Africa (Mpumalanga, KwaZulu-Natal), Sudan, Uganda, Yemen, Zimbabwe, Israel and Palestina.

References

Moths described in 1907
Ulotrichopus
Moths of Africa
Moths of Asia